Malava Khurd is a village in Allahabad, Uttar Pradesh, India.Khurd and Kalan Persian language word which means small and Big respectively when two villages have same name then it is distinguished as Kalan means Big and Khurd means Small with Village Name.

References

Villages in Allahabad district